Donald Malcolm (Donnie) Scott (born August 16, 1961) is an American former professional baseball catcher. From  through , Scott played a role as backup and part-time catcher in Major League Baseball (MLB) for the Texas Rangers, Seattle Mariners, and Cincinnati Reds. While bouncing around in the minor leagues, Scott was also a member of the farm system for the Baltimore Orioles and Milwaukee Brewers. He was part of a one-for-one trade that sent him to Seattle for Orlando Mercado on April 4, 1985.

Until 2008, he was the manager of the Reds 'A' Affiliate Dayton Dragons.

Sources

1961 births
Living people
American expatriate baseball players in Canada
Asheville Tourists managers
Baseball players from Florida
Billings Mustangs managers
Calgary Cannons players
Cincinnati Reds players
Denver Zephyrs players
El Paso Diablos players
Gulf Coast Rangers players
Major League Baseball catchers
Nashville Sounds players
Oklahoma City 89ers players
People from Dunedin, Florida
Rochester Red Wings players
Seattle Mariners players
Texas Rangers players
Tulsa Drillers players